William Thomas (died 1653) was a Welsh politician who sat in the House of Commons  from  1640 to 1644.

Thomas was the son of Sir William Thomas but became a Queen's ward in 1593. He owned lands in Carnarvonshire, Anglesea and Carmarthen with his main house in Carnarvonshire. In 1638 he was High Sheriff of Caernarvonshire.

In December 1640, Thomas was elected Member of Parliament for Carnarvon in the Long Parliament. He was disabled from sitting in Parliament on 5 February 1644 and became Groom of the Privy Chamber to the Queen Consort on 14 February 1644. He compounded £780 for his estates.

References

Year of birth missing
1653 deaths
Members of the Parliament of England (pre-1707) for constituencies in Wales
High Sheriffs of Caernarvonshire
17th-century Welsh politicians
English MPs 1640–1648
Members of Parliament for Caernarfon